Nad Al Hammar is a locality in Dubai, United Arab Emirates (UAE). Nad Al Hammar is a small, residential and industrial community located in Dubai.

The routes E 311 (Emirates Road) and E 44 (Ras Al Khor Road) form the eastern and southern peripheries of Nad Al Hammar. Nad Al Hammar is on the outskirts of Dubai city limits and has a small residential community.  A Dubai Electricity and Water Authority (DEWA) substation is located in the southeast of Nad Al Hammar.

References 

Communities in Dubai